Siegmar Wätzlich (16 November 1947 – 18 April 2019) was a German footballer.

Career

Playing career
Wätzlich played his whole top-flight career for Dynamo Dresden (1967–1975).

On the national level he played for East Germany national team (22 matches), and was a participant at the 1974 FIFA World Cup.

Honours
Dynamo Dresden
 DDR-Oberliga (3): 1970–71, 1972–73, 1975–76
 FDGB-Pokal (1): 1970–71
East Germany
 Olympic Bronze Medal: 1972

References

External links
 
 
 
 

1947 births
2019 deaths
People from Bautzen (district)
German footballers
East German footballers
1974 FIFA World Cup players
Dynamo Dresden players
Footballers at the 1972 Summer Olympics
Olympic footballers of East Germany
Olympic bronze medalists for East Germany
East Germany international footballers
Olympic medalists in football
DDR-Oberliga players
Medalists at the 1972 Summer Olympics
Association football defenders
Footballers from Saxony